Leandro Marcelo de Sousa Teixeira (born 26 April 1998) is a Portuguese footballer who plays for F.C. Penafiel as a defender.

Football career
On 23 February 2019, Teixeira made his professional debut with Penafiel in a 2018–19 LigaPro match against Sporting Covilhã.

References

External links

1998 births
Living people
Portuguese footballers
Association football defenders
Liga Portugal 2 players
F.C. Penafiel players